Sirion could refer to:

Another name for Mount Hermon
Daihatsu Sirion, a car made by Daihatsu
River Sirion in the stories of J. R. R. Tolkien